The Vale of Belvoir covers adjacent areas of Leicestershire, Nottinghamshire and Lincolnshire, England. The name derives from the Norman-French for "beautiful view" and dates back to Norman times.

Extent and geology

The vale is a tract of low ground rising east-north-east, with a somewhat ill-defined area. Its vale-like form can be viewed from either its south-east to eastern flank (the Belvoir "ridge") or from the north-west along the A46 (Roman Fosse Way) from which it is less conspicuous. It is the product of geological processes, being occupied in the main by the sedimentary mudstones and thin limestones of the Liassic (Lias), with a northern fringe from the upper parts of the Triassic (Mercia Mudstone and Rhaetic). The south-eastern margin is the most clearly defined because it is formed by a conspicuous scarp slope, on which Belvoir Castle sits about 330 feet (100 m) above the valley floor. Its resistance to erosion is due to a capping of relatively thick Jurassic Ironstone. The vale-like form is further constrained by cappings of ancient glacial till that form the higher ground along its western margin.

In the Pliocene epoch (1.7 million years ago) the Vale of Belvoir was occupied by the "Proto-Trent" River, which cut a gap through the limestone ridge at Ancaster and then flowed on to the North Sea. At the end of the Wolstonian Stage (c. 130,000 years ago) a mass of stagnant ice left in the Vale of Belvoir caused the river to divert north along the old Lincoln river, through the Lincoln gap.

Settlements

Nottinghamshire

Leicestershire

Lincolnshire

The relatively populous places in or beside the Vale of Belvoir include Bingham, Cotgrave, Keyworth and Bottesford.

Attractions

Belvoir Castle, which occupies a dominant position overlooking the vale, is the ancestral home of the family of the Dukes of Rutland. The castle saw significant damage in both the Wars of the Roses and the English Civil War and has consequently been rebuilt a number of times in its history. It is now open to the public, whilst still remaining a family home. In recent years the Belvoir name has become more widely known through the national and international sale of various cordials and other produce, a scheme introduced by the present duke's father to raise funds for the continued upkeep of the castle and to provide employment in an otherwise farm-dominated local economy.

Two other local specialities dominate the world reputation of the vale: Stilton cheese and pork pies. Of the six dairies currently allowed to produce true Stilton cheese under the terms of its protected origin status, only one is not located in the vale. The vale is the historic centre for the production of this king of English cheeses and until the end of the 19th century all Stilton cheese was being produced within 20 miles of Melton Mowbray. However, the cheese took its name from the Huntingdonshire village of Stilton, where it was served at coaching inns on the Great North Road.

Melton is also the home of the Melton Mowbray pork pie, produced by traditional methods using uncured pork and hand-formed pastry and served cold. Both Stilton cheese and Melton Mowbray pies are covered by European Protected Designation of Origin orders.

"Belvoir Angels" are a type of 18th-century Swithland slate tombstone found in the district. A comprehensive account of the natural history of the vale was compiled in 1790 by the poet George Crabbe, who was chaplain to the Duke of Rutland and later concurrent Rector of Muston, Leicestershire, and the adjacent Allington, Lincolnshire. It includes a list of more than 70 beetle species. The vale was renowned fox hunting country and had many historical ties to the sport.

A controversial coalfield development was proposed in the 1970s. It became the subject of a public enquiry in 1979. The requisite planning applications were ultimately quashed by the secretary of state for the environment in 1982.

The Vale of Belvoir has an award-winning radio station – 103 The Eye – which was the UK's first community radio station and has been broadcasting since 2005. Based in Melton Mowbray, it is heard on 103 FM and on its website.

References

External links

Vale of Belvoir Website – local tourist information page
Belvoir Castle homepage

Valleys of Leicestershire
Valleys of Lincolnshire
Valleys of Nottinghamshire
Public inquiries in the United Kingdom